Jennifer Dugwen Chieng (born April 29, 1986) is an American-born boxer and mixed martial artist who represents the Federated States of Micronesia in sports. She competed at the 2016 Summer Olympics in the women's boxing - lightweight event, in which she was eliminated in the round of 16 by Mikaela Mayer. She was the flag bearer for her country at the Parade of Nations.

Mixed martial arts career

Bellator MMA
Chieng made her pro MMA debut on Oct. 13 at Bellator 208 with a TKO victory over Jessica Ruiz.

Chieng faced Alyssa Linduska on May 11, 2022 at Invicta FC 47. She lost the bout via unanimous decision.

Mixed martial arts record

|-
| Loss
| align=center| 1–2
| Alyssa Linduska
| Decision (unanimous)
| Invicta FC 47: Ducote vs. Zappitella 
|  
| align=center| 3
| align=center| 5:00
| Kansas City, Kansas, United States
|
|-
| Loss
| align=center| 1–1
| Helen Peralta
| Decision (unanimous)
| Invicta FC 42: Cummins vs. Zappitella 
|  
| align=center| 3
| align=center| 5:00
| Kansas City, Kansas, United States
|
|-
| Win
| align=center| 1–0
| Jessica Ruiz
| TKO (strikes)
| Bellator 208
| 
| align=center| 1
| align=center| 1:22
| Uniondale, New York, U.S.
|

References

External links
 
 Jennifer Chieng at Invicta FC

1986 births
Living people
People from Maryland
American women boxers
American female mixed martial artists
Federated States of Micronesia women boxers
Federated States of Micronesia female mixed martial artists
Mixed martial artists utilizing boxing
Olympic boxers of the Federated States of Micronesia
Boxers at the 2016 Summer Olympics
Lightweight boxers
American people of Filipino descent
Federated States of Micronesia people of Filipino descent